Porosana is a genus of moths of the family Erebidae. The genus was described by Schaus in 1913.

Species
Porosana juanalis Schaus, 1916 French Guiana
Porosana micralis Schaus, 1916 French Guiana
Porosana uruca Schaus, 1913 Costa Rica

References

Calpinae